Michel Joseph Napoléon Liénard (1810–1870) was a French sculptor and ornamentalist.

Works 

Variants of the same fountain design were used by Liénard multiple times, with minor alterations:

 Brewer Fountain, Boston (Massachusetts, United States of America)
 Steble Fountain, Liverpool (England, United Kingdom)
 Tourny Fountain, Quebec City (Quebec, Canada), previously in Bordeaux (France)
 Tourny Fountain, Soulac-sur-Mer (France)
 Mail Fountain, Angers (France)
 Fountain in Prince's Square, Launceston (Tasmania, Australia)
 Fountain in the English garden in Geneva (Switzerland)

Among his other fountains based on different designs:

 Fontaine des-Arts-et-Metiers, Square Émile-Chautemps, Paris (1860).

References

External links
 
 Works by Michel Liénard in Musée d'Orsay

1810 births
1870 deaths
19th-century French sculptors
French male sculptors
People from Seine-Maritime
19th-century French male artists